Flyover may refer to:

Overpass, a high-level road bridge that crosses over a highway interchange or intersection
Flying junction, a type of grade-separated railway junction
Flypast or flyby, a celebratory display or ceremonial flight, a ceremonial or honorific flight of one or more aircraft.
Flyover reconnaissance, close-up aircraft reconnaissance
Flyover rights, the right to fly over a foreign country without landing
Aerial survey
Flyover country, a derisive term for the central areas of the United States
Flyovers (play), a play by Jeffrey Sweet
 "Flyover", a song by Asian Dub Foundation from Tank
 FlyOver (ride), a set of flying theater attractions by Viad Corporation
 Flyover (film), 2021 Bengali film
 Flyover, a sculpture in Dayton, Ohio

See also
 Overflight